Nerys Jones (born 30 November 1984) is a British biathlete. Jones competed in the 2014/15 World Cup season, and represented the United Kingdom at the Biathlon World Championships 2015 in Kontiolahti.

References

External links 
 

1984 births
Living people
British female biathletes